Locascio is a surname. Notable people with the surname include:

A. J. Locascio (born 1987), American actor
Frank LoCascio (1932–2021), American mobster
Salvatore LoCascio (born 1958), American mobster
John LoCascio (born 1991), American lacrosse player
Laurie E. Locascio (born 1961), American biomedical engineer 
Peter LoCascio (1916–1997), American mobster
Robert LoCascio (born 1968), American businessman
Sal LoCascio (born 1967), American lacrosse player